Sandi Doughton is an American author and science journalist for The Seattle Times.

Career

Doughton was born in Oklahoma and earned an undergraduate degree from the University of New Mexico with majors in biology and journalism and a minor in chemistry. She chose to enter journalism full time and began her career at the Los Alamos Monitor in Los Alamos, New Mexico. Doughton moved to The News Tribune in Tacoma, Washington, where she was an environment and health reporter before being hired by The Seattle Times.

Her first book, Full-Rip 9.0: The Next Big Earthquake in the Pacific Northwest, was published in 2013 by Sasquatch Books. It describes the earthquake risk posed to the Pacific Northwest by the Cascadia subduction zone, including its discovery in the late 20th century, and predicts its effects on the region's cities and potential aftermath.

Doughton's coverage of the 2014 Oso landslide for The Seattle Times earned her the David Perlman Award for Excellence in Science Journalism from the American Geophysical Union in 2015.

Works

References

External links
Articles by Sandi Doughton at The Seattle Times

Living people
American science journalists
American women journalists
American women writers
The Seattle Times people
Journalists from Oklahoma
21st-century American non-fiction writers
Year of birth missing (living people)
21st-century American women writers